The Abial River is a river of Paraíba state in western Brazil.

See also 
List of rivers of Paraíba

References 
Brazilian Ministry of Transport

Rivers of Paraíba